Emma Harte is the protagonist of Barbara Taylor Bradford's 1979 novel A Woman of Substance. In the 1984 TV mini-series, the character was played by actresses Deborah Kerr and Jenny Seagrove.

Emma Harte's story begins as a maid at Fairley Hall when she is 14 years old. She falls in love with her master's son, Edwin Fairley. She becomes pregnant and he "lets her down" by refusing to marry her. She flees to Leeds at 15, so as not to disgrace her father and brothers.

In Leeds, Emma seeks out her friend Blackie O'Neil. Her daughter Edwina is born when she is 16 years old. After more than a year of scrimping, saving, working day and night and creating a home business on the side, she finally saves enough to open her own shop. It is the beginning of an empire so vast she eventually buys everything the Fairleys own.

There are seven books written by Barbara Taylor Bradford in the Emma Harte series:
 A Woman of Substance
 Hold the Dream
 To Be The Best
 Emma's Secret
 Unexpected Blessings
 Just Rewards
 Breaking the Rules

External links 
 http://www.barbarataylorbradford.com/

Literary characters introduced in 1979
Characters in British novels of the 20th century
Fictional maids
Female characters in literature